EAB is a consulting firm specializing in education institutions. It is headquartered in Washington, DC, with satellite offices in Richmond, Virginia, Birmingham, Alabama, and Minneapolis.

EAB serves roughly 2500 schools, colleges, and universities. The company's technology division focuses on enrollment management, student success, and institutional operations and strategy.

History 
EAB, formerly the Education Advisory Board, was founded in 2007 as a division of The Advisory Board Company. This was officially shortened to EAB in 2014.

In December 2014, it was announced that The Advisory Board Company was to acquire Royall & Company, based in Richmond, Virginia, for $850M. Royall & Company was founded in 1983 and specialized in enrollment management, financial aid models and alumni fundraising; These services were integrated into EAB.

In 2015, the parent company acquired GradesFirst, a "student success technology" company based in Birmingham, Alabama. This became EAB's Student Success Collaborative (SSC) platform.

On November 17, 2017, EAB announced that it would become an independent company, separate from The Advisory Board Company, and would be acquired by Vista Equity Partners, a leading investment firm for roughly $1.5B.

On February 18, 2021, EAB announced that it would acquire Starfish from Hobsons.

References

External links 
 

Consulting firms established in 2007
Privately held companies based in Washington, D.C.
Private equity portfolio companies
American companies established in 2007
2017 mergers and acquisitions
2007 establishments in Washington, D.C.